Vladimir Aleksandrovich Kazmenko; born September 27, 1975 in Rostov-on-Don is a Russian professional football referee. He has officiated matches of the Russian Premier League since 2009 and was given charge of the 2010 Russian Cup Final.

Kazmenko became a FIFA referee in 2011. He was removed from the FIFA list in 2014.

References

Russian football referees
1975 births
Living people